Franck "Francky" Vandendriessche (born 7 April 1971) is a Belgian former professional footballer who played as a goalkeeper.

Club career
Vandendriessche was born in Waregem. Among his former clubs are K.S.V. Waregem and Cercle Brugge.

International career
Vandendriessche played one game with the Belgium national team against Croatia due to the injuries of both Geert De Vlieger and Frédéric Herpoel and Belgium lost 4–0.  He was in the team for the 2002 World Cup.

Coaching career
After his playing career, Vandendriessche became goalkeeping coach for his former team Mouscron. But due to financial uncertainty at Mouscron, he decided to move to Mons during the summer break of 2009. Assistant manager Geert Broeckaert would follow him a bit later.

On 10 July 2009, he became goalkeeping coach of the Belgium national team but was sacked on 6 October 2009 for having allegedly given a journalist from the Flemish newspaper Het Laatste Nieuws details about team selection before it had been officially announced. The Belgian goalkeeper Stijn Stijnen retired from the Belgian football team on the same day in connection with this incident. He was from 2007, the goalkeeping coach at Excelsior Mouscron until June 2009, and a short time later became the goalkeeper coach at Mons. In May 2011, he became goalkeeping coach at K.V. Kortrijk.

Honours

Player 
KSV Waregem

 Second Division: 1993–94

Belgium
 FIFA Fair Play Trophy: 2002 World Cup

Individual
 Belgian Professional Goalkeeper of the Year: 2001–02

References

External links
 Cerclemuseum.be
 Profile from the Belgian Pro League
 Footgoal
 Profile from Cercle Brugge
 

1971 births
Living people
People from Waregem
Belgian footballers
Belgium international footballers
Association football goalkeepers
Royal Excel Mouscron players
Cercle Brugge K.S.V. players
2002 FIFA World Cup players
Belgian Pro League players
Association football goalkeeping coaches
Footballers from West Flanders